Sean Lawrence Guy Edwards (6 December 1986 − 15 October 2013) was an English professional racing driver, whose career highlight was winning as co-driver the 2013 Nurburgring 24 Hours. He died as a passenger in a private testing incident in October 2013, at Queensland Raceway in Australia.

Early and personal life
Edwards was born in London on 6 December 1986, the son of racing driver Guy Edwards. He was educated at Wellington College and Cherwell College in Oxford. He lived and was based in Monaco.

Career
Edwards started racing at the age of eleven taking part in karting competitions.

After gaining fourth place in the 2003 British Formula Ford Championship, he gained 5th in the 2004 Formula Renault UK, and fifth in the 2005 British GT Championship.

Moving to Monaco, he then undertook drives in various years of the FIA GT3 European Championship, the Porsche Supercup (latterly with Team Allyouneed) and the American Le Mans Series (with MOMO NGT Motorsport). In 2006 he won the FIA European GT3 championship driving a Tech9 Motorsports Porsche GT3 Cup Car.  In May 2013 he won the Nurburgring 24 Hours, his first major victory in endurance racing, driving a Mercedes-Benz SLS AMG GT3 alongside Bernd Schneider, Jeroen Bleekemolen and Nicki Thiim.

One of the first professional racing drivers to embrace Sim racing as a means of development and training, in 2012 he assisted with the racing scenes in Ron Howard's film Rush, about the battle between James Hunt and Niki Lauda in the 1976 Formula One season. The younger Edwards also portrayed his father in several scenes of the film, the latter being among the drivers who pulled Lauda from the burning wreckage of his formula one racing car during the 1976 German Grand Prix.

Death
On 15 October 2013, Edwards was killed in a crash during a private session at Queensland Raceway in Willowbank, Queensland, Australia as a passenger whilst instructing Will Holzheimer of Dellow Racing in a Porsche 996 Supercup car. Holzheimer was treated at Royal Brisbane Hospital for injuries and burns.

Racing record

Career summary

Complete Porsche Supercup results
(key) (Races in bold indicate pole position) (Races in italics indicate fastest lap)

Complete 24 Hours of Spa results

Complete 24 Hours of Le Mans results

Complete 24 Hours of Dubai results

Complete Nürburgring 24 Hours results

References

External links

 (official)

1986 births
2013 deaths
Sportspeople from London
People educated at Wellington College, Berkshire
English racing drivers
English expatriate sportspeople in Australia
English expatriate sportspeople in Monaco
24 Hours of Le Mans drivers
24 Hours of Daytona drivers
European Le Mans Series drivers
American Le Mans Series drivers
Rolex Sports Car Series drivers
Porsche Supercup drivers
Blancpain Endurance Series drivers
Britcar 24-hour drivers
International GT Open drivers
ADAC GT Masters drivers
24 Hours of Spa drivers
Sport deaths in Australia
Accidental deaths in Queensland
Racing drivers who died while racing
Nürburgring 24 Hours drivers
24H Series drivers
Porsche Carrera Cup Germany drivers